José Legarreta Abaitua (12 February 1903 – 17 September 1957) was a Spanish footballer who represented his nation at the 1928 Summer Olympics in the Netherlands.

Career statistics

Club

Notes

References

External links
 

1903 births
1957 deaths
Spanish footballers
Association football midfielders
Athletic Bilbao footballers
La Liga players
Footballers from the Basque Country (autonomous community)
Olympic footballers of Spain
Footballers at the 1928 Summer Olympics
People from Greater Bilbao
Sportspeople from Biscay
Spain international footballers